The Paris Expo Porte de Versailles is an exhibition and conference centre in Paris, France. It is located in the 15th arrondissement at Porte de Versailles Métro station between the Boulevard Périphérique and Boulevards of the Marshals. It is the largest exhibition park in France.

Paris Expo Porte de Versailles boasts  of exhibition floor, 8 pavilions, 2 auditoriums, 32 meeting rooms. The  exhibition center hosts over 120 trade-shows every year plus events, many product launches and conventions. The Tour Triangle, a 180 metres tall glass pyramid, is planned to be constructed near the site. It houses a 120-room hotel and 70,000 square metres of office space.

Paris Expo will be a venue of the 2024 Summer Olympics, hosting handball, volleyball and table tennis competitions.

Events
 Bijorhca Paris, salon
 Equipmag, point of sale, retail and distribution exhibition
 Foire de Paris retail fair April–May
 Paris Autumn Fair
 IFTM, Professional Tourism Fair
 International Hobby Model Making Fair
Paris International Agricultural Show
 Mondial de l’Automobile (Motor Show)
 Paris Games Week
 Prêt-à-Porter Summer Paris, trade fair
 Rétromobile
 Six Paris Major
European Respiratory Society (ERS) International Congress 2018, 15–19 September
69th FIFA Congress
Federation of European Neuroscience Societies Forum 2022

Transport
Paris expo Porte de Versailles is served by:
Porte de Versailles station on Paris Métro line 12 (offering  a direct link to Gare Montparnasse and Gare Saint-Lazare);
 tramway lines T2 and T3a (stop 'Porte de Versailles');
 RATP bus routes 39 (stop 'Desnouettes' or 'Porte d'Issy') and 80 (stop 'Porte de Versailles'); 
 Noctilien night bus routes N13, N62 and N145.

References

External links

  

Convention centers in France
Buildings and structures in the 15th arrondissement of Paris
Venues of the 2024 Summer Olympics
Olympic table tennis venues
Olympic volleyball venues